Kundesar is a village in Ghazipur district, Uttar Pradesh. It has a population of 3141, per the 2011 Census. Having a history of five hundred years, this village has rich heritage of the Kinwar clan. Kundesar has got special mention in the gazetteers of Ghazipur since 1781. Kundesar is situated on the Ghazipur–Patna National Highway 19.

History
Kundesar was established by Raja Bhairav Shah’s eldest grandson Taluqdar Babu Madhav Rai  in the year 1507 A.D on the bank of river Ganga. In the fifth generation of Raja Mulhan Dikshit, Raja Bhairo Shah was the last person who migrated from Sahamadih to Gondaur and built a fort.  As per the genealogical records Kashyap gotriya 'Kinwar' Dikshit warrior family uprooted Cheru tribal rulers from Gadhipuri and the surrounding area after a series of battles fought for Gahadavalas. Dikshit Brahmins and Gahadvalas both came to Kannauj from Dakshinapatha. In an edict of Gahadavala King Chandradeva, it is mentioned that he got hold of Gadhipuri near the holy city of Kashi with the help of Brahmin warriors. Leading role of 'Mulhan Dikshit' in the Gahadvala military campaign is described in ‘Sri pothi bansauri’ in details. As a goodwill gesture Gahadvala King conferred him the title of ‘Raja’ along with a grant of seven hundred villages across Azamgarh, Mau, Ballia and Ghazipur districts. Later on the clan flourished in three main branches i.e. Birpur, Narayanpur-Kundesar and Karimuddinpur.

In British raj Kudesar's Babu Girija Prasad Narayan Singh's estate consisted 37 shares in Mohammadabad paragana and one in Zahurabad, with an area of approximately 2,000 acres and a revenue demand of Rs. 3,028.

Kundesar has produced illustrious people like Babu Hari Narayan Singh, Babu Siddheshwar Prasad Singh. Vijay Shankar Singh, Virendra Narayan Singh, Shri Murli Manohar Singh, Dr. Krisna Murari Singh and Dr. Anand Shankar Singh. Babu Hari Narayan Singh was a renowned wrestler who killed a man-eater (lion) fighting without any weapon. Babu Siddheshwar Prasad Singh was a renowned socialist leader of his time. Vijay Shankar Singh represented Mohammedabad assembly constituency since 1952, till 1985 as Member of Legislative Assembly (MLA), continuously, with a gap of one term in between. He was A lawyer by profession. V.N. Singh, IPS was Commissioner of Police, Delhi from May, 1998 to June, 1999. Dr. K.M. Singh is working as Director Extension Education at Dr. Rajendra Prasad Central Agricultural University, Pusa, Samastipur, Bihar. He has served in several responsible position in ICAR before the current responsibility. Dr. Anand Shankar Singh is currently working as member secretary of Indian Council of Historical Research (ICHR).

The son of the late Shri Basdev Rai, Sri Sri 108 Vigyanananda Saraswati ji (Sri Dandi Swami 1907 - 20 June 1974) was an ascetic who left home (kundesar) at a very young age after his marriage and became Dandi Swami following the path shown by his Guru Late Shri Sri Hansanand Saraswati Ji Maharaj. He built an ashram (with the help of Villagers) in Kathooda Village of Ballia district (Sikanderpur tehsil) of Uttar Pradesh State situated on the bank of Ghaghara River. He said goodbye to this world on 20 June 1974.

The Kathooda villagers have build a temple in 1978 remembering him with a marble statue being manufactured by Jaipur sculpture artists. These day the temple is famous and being maintained by the local villagers.

Agriculture
Though a number of people from this village have been in government services earning laurels to the village, agriculture is the main source of income and livelihood for the majority of the residents. Nearly all type of food grains which are cultivated in eastern UP are also produced here, popular crops include wheat, paddy and potatoes, though other crops such as mustard, lentils, grams are also produced in large quantities, the village has privately owned rice mills and oil mills. Farmers often sell their products either in the local market or in the anaj mandi (government food grains store house) located in Yusufpur. Farming is done with semi modern and semi classical techniques, tractors electrical water pumping sets are used for farming but bigger machines like harvesters are also used in the village.

Language and culture
The language spoken by majority in the village is a mix of Bhojpuri and Hindi, though Urdu has also a great influence on it. Culturally the area is much influenced by Varanasi which is a major cultural center nearby. On the occasion of Kartik Purnima a fair i.e. 'Chatani Dadari Mela' is held by the villagers every year.

Nearby places
Ghazipur
Ballia
Buxar
Varanasi
Mughalsarai
Patna
Sherpur, Ghazipur
Yusufpur

References

External links
Villages in Ghazipur  Uttar Pradesh

Villages in Ghazipur district